The Best MLS Player ESPY Award is an annual award honoring the achievements of an individual from the world of Major League Soccer (MLS). It was first awarded as part of the ESPY Awards in 2006. The Best MLS Player ESPY Award trophy, designed by sculptor Lawrence Nowlan, is presented to the MLS player adjudged to be the best in a given calendar year at the annual ESPY Awards ceremony in Los Angeles. Balloting for the award is undertaken by fans over the Internet from between three and five nominees selected by the ESPN Select Nominating Committee, which is composed by a panel of experts. It is conferred in July to reflect performance and achievement over the preceding twelve months, which generally includes a portion of each of two MLS seasons.

The inaugural winner of the Best MLS Player ESPY Award was LA Galaxy forward Landon Donovan in 2006. He is one of two people to have been presented with the award more than once in its history, winning it a further four times in 2007, 2009, 2010 and 2011; he also earned a nomination in 2008. English right midfielder David Beckham, also for LA Galaxy, has been the second most successful player, winning twice in 2008 and 2012. American players have been the most successful with five wins and twenty-eight nominations, while those who play in the position of a forward have been recognized on fourteen occasions, and those who have played for LA Galaxy have won a total of nine awards. It was not awarded in 2020 due to the COVID-19 pandemic. The most recent winner of the award was Carlos Vela of Los Angeles FC in 2022.

Winners and nominees
 Player's team won the MLS Cup   Player's team lost in the MLS Cup † MLS Cup MVP

Statistics

See also
 Landon Donovan MVP Award
 MLS Best XI

References

External links
 

ESPY Awards
Major League Soccer trophies and awards
Major League Soccer
Annual events in the United States